Cocoon Recordings is a record label founded in 2000 and operated by DJ and electronic music producer Sven Väth. Based in Frankfurt, Germany, Cocoon is a division of the Cocoon Music Event GmbH.

Väth founded Cocoon Recordings in order to complete the Cocoon platform as a supporting tool for young artists in Electronic Music..

Notable artist

 Adam Beyer
 Anthony Rother
 Beroshima
 Chaim
 David K
 Daze Maxim
 Dominik Eulberg
 Extrawelt
 Frank Lorber
 Funk D'Void
 Guy Gerber
 Guy J
 Ilario Alicante
 Jacek Sienkiewicz
 Legowelt
 Loco Dice
 Minilogue
 Onur Özer
 Phil Kieran 
 Pig & Dan
 Pascal F.E.O.S.
 Raresh
 Ricardo Villalobos
 Richard Bartz
 Roman Flügel
 Simon Wish
 Stefan Goldmann
 Steve Bug
 Sven Väth
 Tobi Neumann
 Zombie Nation

Notable releases

Singles / EPs
2010 Simon Wish "Dawn's Highway" (10")
2009 Stefan Goldmann "Yes To All" (12")
2007 Guy Gerber "Late bloomers" (12")
2006 Guy Gerber "This Is Balagan" (12")
2006 Guy Gerber & Shlomi Aber "Sea Of Sand" (12")
2005 Väth vs. Rother "Komm" (12")
2005 Oliver Koletzki "Der Mückenschwarm" (12")
2002 Legowelt "Disco Rout" (12")

Albums 

 2009 Phil Kieran "Shh" (CD, vinyl)

Compilations
2011 "Various Artists" - Cocoon Compilation K (CD, unmixed)
2010 Various Artists - Sven Vath In The Mix - The Sound Of The Eleventh Season (2CD, mixed)
2010 Various Artists - Cocoon Compilation J (CD, unmixed)
2009 Various Artists - Sven Vath In The Mix - The Sound Of The Tenth Season (2CD, mixed)
2009 Various Artists - Cocoon Compilation I (CD, unmixed)
2008 Various Artists - Sven Vath In The Mix - The Sound Of The Ninth Season (2CD, mixed)
2008 Various Artists - Cocoon Compilation H (CD, unmixed)
2007 Various Artists - Sven Vath In The Mix - The Sound Of The Eighth Season (2CD, mixed)
2007 Various Artists - Raresh & André Galuzzi - Freak Show (2CD, mixed)
2007 Various Artists - Cocoon Compilation G (CD, unmixed)
2006 Various Artists - Sven Vath In The Mix - The Sound Of The Seventh Season (2CD, mixed)
2006 Various Artists - Cocoon Compilation F (CD, unmixed)
2005 Various Artists - Sven Vath In The Mix - The Sound Of The Sixth Season (2CD, mixed)
2006 Various Artists - Väth & Hawtin In The Mix - The Sound Of The Third Season (2CD, mixed)
2004 Various Artists - Loco Dice & Villalobos - Green & Blue (2CD, mixed)
2003 Various Artists - Funk D'Void - iFunk (CD, mixed)
2003 Various Artists - Ricardo Villalobos - Taka Taka (CD, mixed)
2002 Various Artists - Cocoon Compilation C (CD, unmixed)
2001 Various Artists - Steve Bug - presents The Flow (CD, mixed)
2001 Various Artists - Cocoon Compilation B (CD, unmixed)
2000 Various Artists - Cocoon Compilation A (CD, unmixed)

See also
 List of electronic music record labels
 Electronic music
 Techno

References

External links
Cocoon Recordings - Official website
Official last.fm Account
 
Official mySpace Account
Cocoon Club - Official website
  Article à propos du label Cocoon Recordings

German record labels
Electronic music record labels
Record labels established in 2000
2000 establishments in Germany
Techno record labels